Neoxanthias is a genus of crabs in the family Xanthidae, containing the following species:

 Neoxanthias impressus (Latreille, 1812)
 Neoxanthias lacunosus (Rathbun, 1906)
 Neoxanthias michelae Serene & Vadon, 1981

References

Xanthoidea